Ivan "Ivica" Šurjak (born 23 March 1953) is a Croatian retired football midfielder. He was the driving force behind the success of Hajduk Split as it became a force in the Yugoslav First League in the 1970s.

Club career
He started his career as a left back, but with time learned total football, according to which all players can, during the ebb and flow of the match, slot into every position as needed. He continued his career at Paris Saint-Germain and Udinese, but turned down offers by the New York Cosmos and Real Madrid. He concluded his playing career in Spain at Real Zaragoza.

International career
Šurjak made his debut for Yugoslavia in an October 1973 World Cup qualification against Spain, coming on as a 61st-minute substitute for Petar Krivokuća, and earned a total of 54 caps, scoring 10 goals. His final international was a June 1982 FIFA World Cup match against Honduras.

Post-playing career
He served as a sports director at Hajduk Split of the Croatian First Football League from 1999 to 2003.

Speedboat incident
In July 1999, Šurjak killed a swimmer while driving a speedboat near the coast of Trogir (Croatia). The swimmer, Miroslav Didak, died a few days after the accident, while in a coma in the intensive care unit of the Firule hospital. Šurjak was subsequently cleared of any wrongdoing.

Accomplishments 
 Champion of Yugoslavia – 1974, 1975 and 1979
 Co-champion of Yugoslavia – 1976 and 1981
 Cup winner of Yugoslavia – 1972, 1973, 1974, 1976 and 1977
 Coupe de France – 1982
 54 caps for Yugoslavia, 10 goals scored between 1973 and 1982
 Yugoslav Footballer of the Year – 1976

References

External links
 

1953 births
Living people
Footballers from Split, Croatia
Association football midfielders
Yugoslav footballers
Yugoslavia international footballers
1974 FIFA World Cup players
UEFA Euro 1976 players
1982 FIFA World Cup players
HNK Hajduk Split players
Paris Saint-Germain F.C. players
Udinese Calcio players
Real Zaragoza players
Yugoslav First League players
Ligue 1 players
Serie A players
La Liga players
Yugoslav expatriate footballers
Expatriate footballers in France
Yugoslav expatriate sportspeople in France
Expatriate footballers in Italy
Yugoslav expatriate sportspeople in Italy
Expatriate footballers in Spain
Yugoslav expatriate sportspeople in Spain